Yuji Hirayama (平山ユージ; born February 23, 1969) is a Japanese rock climber specializing in lead climbing competitions. He won two Lead World Cups, in 1998 (becoming the first Asian climber to win the title) and in 2000. He is notable for being the first-ever climber to onsight an  route, and for his various speed records on El Capitan.

Climbing career

On September 29, 2002, Hirayama and Hans Florine climbed The Nose in 2:48:55, setting a new speed record.

In 2003, he made the first ascent of a proposed  called Flat Mountain.

On October 6, 2004, he onsighted the  graded White Zombie in Baltzola Cave, ESP. This was the world's first-ever onsight of an 8c in history.). On 2005 Aug 10, Tomas Mrazek had the 2nd 8c onsight, Pata Negra at Rodellar in eastern Spain.

In 2007, his El Capitan Nose record was broken by the German "Huberbuam", Alexander Huber and Thomas Huber. The two brothers climbed The Nose on October 8, 2007 in 2 hours, 45 minutes and 45 seconds. On July 2, 2008, Hirayama and Florine retook the record in a time of 2:43:33. Then on October 12, 2008, they lowered the record to 2:37:05.

In 2008, he made the third ascent of boulder problem, Uma  at Shiobara, and the first ascent of Ginga  at Kanoto.

In 2012, he freed a multi-pitch route called Pogulian Do Koduduo in the Mount Kinabalu National Park in Borneo with one pitch at 9a.

Business career
In 2010, Hirayama opened "Climb Park Base Camp", a climbing gym in Saitama prefecture, Japan.

See also 
History of rock climbing
List of first ascents (sport climbing)

References

External links
 
 
 Onsight of White Zombie

Japanese rock climbers
Living people
1969 births
Sportspeople from Tokyo
IFSC Climbing World Championships medalists
IFSC Climbing World Cup overall medalists